Delturus angulicauda is a species of armored catfish found in the Mucuri River basin.

References

Loricariidae
Catfish of South America
Fish of Brazil
Endemic fauna of Brazil
Taxa named by Franz Steindachner
Fish described in 1877